Bullet Points is a Marvel comic limited series that was published in 2006 and 2007, written by J. Michael Straczynski, illustrated by Tommy Lee Edwards and lettered by John Workman.

The series was released under the Marvel Knights imprint and examines the consequences to the Marvel Universe when Steve Rogers isn't injected with the Super-Soldier Serum but instead is Iron Man.

Plot summary

The series begins on December 8, 1940. Dr. Abraham Erskine is killed by a German spy, along with MP Benjamin Parker, before the Super-Soldier Serum was to be used for Project: Rebirth.

Due to the assassination, Project: Rebirth is canceled. The US government activates Project: Iron Man and asks Steve Rogers to participate in it. Steve accepts, and is permanently bonded to the Iron Man armor. Iron Man debuts during the Battle of Guadalcanal, going on to help win the Second World War. Rogers goes on to become an essential part of American military tactics over the resulting decades, drafting Dr. Reed Richards to provide technical support.

Meanwhile, lacking the guidance of a role model who taught him the value of responsibility as a result of Benjamin's death, Peter Parker grows up to become a disaffected, trouble-making punk. At one point, Peter decides to sneak out of a field trip to a desert base and goes joyriding with friends in a stolen jeep. After the jeep breaks down, Peter goes off to find fuel, but accidentally wanders into a test site just as a gamma bomb is detonated. Soon after recovering from the explosion and returning home, Peter is confronted by the two friends, who accuse him of getting them into trouble. Peter becomes angry and turns into the Hulk, destroying property around him. The Hulk is confronted by the police. May Parker recognizes the Hulk as Peter and suffers a heart attack, which causes him to flee in distress.

As a result of Peter's transformation, the recently retired Rogers is drafted back to wear the Iron Man armor to capture Peter. After visiting May in hospital to say goodbye before running away, Peter is confronted by Iron Man and several army troops. Rejecting Rogers's attempts to calm him, Peter turns into the Hulk and confronts Iron Man. After a long fight outside the hospital, the Hulk eventually kills Iron Man; realizing what he has done, Peter flees in terror.

Meanwhile, Reed Richards, along with his co-pilots Ben Grimm, Sue Storm and Johnny Storm, launch into space in a rocket designed to collect cosmic rays. However, the rocket explodes before it can reach orbit due to sabotage, crashing back to Earth and killing Ben, Johnny and Sue, with Reed being the only survivor. Reed is then invited to lead the spy organization S.H.I.E.L.D. As head of S.H.I.E.L.D., Reed uses his technical genius and scientific background to pioneer numerous radical technologies and also drafts others, including Bruce Banner, Stephen Strange, and Tony Stark, into the organization.

Blaming himself and his gamma bomb for Parker's condition, Bruce Banner begins to obsessively research methods of curing Peter. During one of his experiments, he is bitten by a radioactive spider collected from the gamma bomb test site and mutates into a feral half-man, half-spider creature. After going on the run for two years, Bruce is captured and becomes Spider-Man after having his mutation brought under control.

Galactus arrives on Earth alongside his herald the Silver Surfer, intending to consume the planet as he has consumed others over the millennia. The US Army and Air Force are wiped out as they confront the Silver Surfer. Earth's superhumans attempt to stop Galactus, only to be killed or injured en masse, with only a few managing to come through the battle unscathed. The Hulk emerges from seclusion, attacks Galactus, and dies after being blasted by the Power Cosmic. Parker's death inspires the Silver Surfer to attack Galactus, who eventually leaves Earth after killing the Silver Surfer. The series ends with an epilogue at Rogers's and Parker's gravestones.

Characters
 Iron Man (Steve Rogers): Soldier in World War II who volunteers for Project: Iron Man. He dies after attempting to subdue and arrest the Hulk.
 Hulk (Peter Parker): Exposed to gamma bomb who turns into the Hulk whenever angry. He runs away after accidentally killing Iron Man. He later emerges from seclusion and dies while attacking Galactus.
 Dr. Reed Richards: Government scientist working on "Project: Iron Man", is director of S.H.I.E.L.D. after the crash landing of his rocket and the deaths of the co-pilots. He resembles Nick Fury in appearance.
 Spider-Man (Bruce Banner): S.H.I.E.L.D. scientist who is bitten by a radioactive spider and gains spider-like abilities.

See also
 JLA: The Nail by DC Comics - a story by DC with a similar concept.

References

External links
Issue #1 solicitation
Issue #2 solicitation
Issue #3 solicitation
Issue #4 solicitation
Issue #5 solicitation
Straczynski press conference

2006 comics debuts
Comics by J. Michael Straczynski